Anton Vriesde (born 18 October 1968) is a retired Dutch footballer. A defender, he played for several clubs in the Netherlands, and for KFC Uerdingen and VfL Bochum in Germany.

Career statistics

References

External links

Profile at vi.nl 

1968 births
Living people
Dutch footballers
ADO Den Haag players
MVV Maastricht players
KFC Uerdingen 05 players
VfL Bochum players
Helmond Sport players
Dutch sportspeople of Surinamese descent
Footballers from The Hague
Association football defenders